Prison riots in Brazil that began on May 26, 2019 resulted in the deaths of at least 112 people as of July 29, 2019. The riots occurred at several prisons in the northern Brazilian state of Amazonas.  Rival factions of the illicit Brazilian drug trade were responsible for the fighting.

Prisons

May

Anísio Jobim penitentiary center, Manaus, 15 killed on May 26, 4 killed on May 27.

Antonio Trindade penal institute, 25 killed on May 27.

Puraquequara jail, 6 killed on May 27.

Provisional Detention Centre for Men, 5 killed on May 27.

July
2019 Altamira prison riot: Altamira jail, Pará, at least 57 inmates killed, including sixteen who were beheaded, during five-hours of rioting between rival gangs on 29 July.

See also 
2017 Brazil prison riots

References 

2019 riots
2019 murders in Brazil
May 2019 crimes in South America
May 2019 events in Brazil
July 2019 crimes in South America
July 2019 events in Brazil
Massacres in Brazil
Organized crime conflicts in Brazil
Prison uprisings in Brazil
Violent non-state actor incidents in South America